Passeri is a surname. Notable people with the surname include:
Cinzio Passeri Aldobrandini, Italian Cardinal, nephew of Pope Clement VIII
Giovanni Battista Passeri  (c. 1610 – 1679), Italian painter and biographer of artists of the Baroque period
Giuseppe Passeri, Italian painter of the Baroque period (nephew of Giovanni Battista Passeri)
Marco Antonio Passeri, Italian Renaissance Aristotelian philosopher

Italian-language surnames
Surnames from nicknames